Hajjah is the capital city of Hajjah Governorate in north-western Yemen. It is located 127 kilometres northwest of Sana'a, at an elevation of about 1800 metres. As of 2003, the Hajjah City District had a population of 53,887 inhabitants.

Etymology
According to Arab traditions, the name Hajjah came from Hajjah Ibn Aslam Ibn Ali Ibn Hashid. Some traditions say that Hajjah was also called Hajour, all the tribes in Hajjah are branches from Hajour tribe.

History

Historically, the name Hajjah referred to a district rather than a town. It was the mountainous region around the modern town, stretching northward towards al-Zafir, and separated from the mountain formations to the east, west, and north by the Wadi Sharis and the Wadi Mawr. There were numerous forts in this area during the Middle Ages. The 10th-century writer al-Hamdani counted Hajjah as part of the broader districts of Sarāt Qudam or Sarāt al-Maṣāniʽ, with Hajjah appearing to be on the border between the two. He wrote that its population mostly belonged to the Qudam tribe, and that its name was derived from one Ḥajjah b. Aslam b. ‘Aliyyān b. Zayd, of the tribe of Hashid. Other medieval writers to mention Hajjah include Muhammad ibn Salah al-Sharafi and Yahya ibn al-Husayn. The area's suq, which belonged to the Hashid tribe, may have been at the site of the modern town, but the roads in the area appear to have been different in the middle ages, based on Hamdani's description, so this is uncertain.

During the 1700s, Hajjah still referred mainly to the geographical region, as shown by the map drawn by Carsten Niebuhr in the 1700s, which shows a region called "Belled Hadsj" rather than a town by that name. By the time Eduard Glaser visited in the late 1800s, however, the modern town of Hajjah had begun to develop. Its population in the census of 1975 was 5,613.

Climate

References

Populated places in Hajjah Governorate